This is a list of the highest-grossing films in Mainland China. Most of the data below is provided by EntGroup's China Box Office (CBO) website, with the gross in yuan.

Highest-grossing films by box office revenue

Top 50 all-time highest-grossing films
 Films that are currently in cinema

Top 20 domestic films
 Films that are currently in cinema

Top 20 foreign films
 Films that are currently in cinema

Highest-grossing films by box office admissions

Timeline of highest-grossing films
Up until the 1980s, the Chinese box office was typically reported in terms of box office admissions (ticket sales), rather than gross revenue. The foreign film with the highest ticket sales in China was the 1976 Japanese film Kimi yo Fundo no Kawa o Watare (Manhunt), which had its Chinese release in 1978 and sold more than  tickets in China, followed by the Indian film Caravan (1971) which had its Chinese release in 1979 and sold about  tickets in China. Hollywood film releases were relatively rare in China up until First Blood (1982), which had its Chinese release in 1985, and went on to sell  tickets, the highest for a Hollywood film in China up until 2018.

China began releasing box office gross revenue results for foreign non-Chinese films in November 1994, upon the release of The Fugitive (1993). In 1995, the Hong Kong action film Rumble in the Bronx, directed by Stanley Tong and starring Jackie Chan, became the all-time highest-grossing foreign film in China, where it grossed ; it is not considered a domestic film as it was produced in Hong Kong (then a British Dependent Territory). It was above the year's highest domestic Chinese film, Jiang Wen's In the Heat of the Sun with ¥50 million. Stanley Tong and Jackie Chan surpassed their own record with the Hong Kong action film Police Story 4: First Strike (1996), which grossed  in China. In 1998, Titanic (directed by James Cameron) became the all-time highest grossing film to be released in China, with a then-unprecedented ¥360 million. China's first domestic film to breach ¥360 million was released in 2009, The Founding of a Republic. In 2015, Monster Hunt became the first domestic film in 17 years to become the overall highest-grossing film in China, earning ¥2.44 billion.

Highest-grossing films by year
Since the 1990s, the most represented filmmaker in the chart has been American film director Michael Bay with four films to his credit, occupying the top spot in 2001, 2007, 2011, and 2014. Among domestic filmmakers, Feng Xiaogang (1999, 2003, 2008) and Stephen Chow (2004, 2013, 2016) are the most represented with three films each.

 Films that are currently in cinema (as of April 2022)

Box office milestones

Highest-grossing openings 
A list of the highest-grossing openings for films in China. Since many films do not open on Fridays in China, the 'opening' is taken to be the gross between the first day of release and the first Sunday following the movie's release.

Opening records
These are the films that, when first released, set the opening record in China. Since many films do not open on Fridays in China, the 'opening' is taken to be the gross between the first day of release and the first Sunday following the movie's release.

Opening days

See also
List of highest-grossing films in Hong Kong
List of highest-grossing Indian films in overseas markets

Notes

References

China
Highest-grossing films
Highest-grossing films in China